John Deering may refer to:

 John Deering (baseball) (1879–1943), professional baseball player
 John Deering (murderer) (1898–1938), murderer executed by State of Utah
 John Deering (politician) (1833–1904), mayor of Portland, Maine